Udaya Geetham is a 1985 Indian Tamil-language thriller film directed by K. Rangaraj. The film stars Mohan, Lakshmi and Revathi, with Goundamani, Senthil, Anand Babu, and Prathapachandran in supporting roles. It revolves around a singer who is facing a death sentence for a murder he did not commit, and the efforts of a young girl to clear his name. The film was released on 13 April 1985 and was a commercial success, running for 148 days in theatres and thereby becoming a silver jubilee film.

Plot 
Arun is a singer sentenced to death. He meets Shanthi, a fan, during one of his concerts and she follows him on many occasions both within and outside prison. Arun shows deep animosity towards Shanthi's behaviour and continuously shuns her, but a persistent Shanthi refuses to give up. Maari, an inmate, attempts a prison escape but is stopped by Arun. He tells Arun about his sick daughter, and his inability to pay for her operation. A sympathetic Arun promises to raise funds for the sick child through his next concert, which he also plans shall be his final one.

Leela Chowdhry is the newly appointed Superintendent of Police for the Madras Central Jail, where Arun is imprisoned. Shanthi talks her into getting her married to Arun, who also agrees to it after deeply thinking and deliberating. The wedding takes places in Leela's house. During their wedding night, Shanthi stabs Arun and reveals herself as the sister of Anand, for whose murder Arun was convicted. Anand was Arun's musical partner in their troupe before his murder. Arun claims he was wrongfully convicted and Shanthi, believing him, promises to clear his name.

Leela allows Shanthi and Arun to go to a nearby temple, but sends policemen along with them to prevent Arun from escaping. Shanthi outsmarts them and takes Arun to her home where she imprisons him, much to his dislike. She makes it seemingly impossible for him to escape, until she is able to prove his innocence. Leela is later punished for having let Arun "escape", and simultaneously realises that Arun is her long lost son, becoming heartbroken. However, she remains bound to her duty of capturing Arun, and a manhunt for him begins.

Shanthi later meets Shankar, the real killer of Anand. He admits to the murder, but states that did so because he witnessed Anand sleeping with his wife. Shanthi, knowing that Shankar's wife is promiscuous (it was she who seduced the reluctant Anand), takes him to her and Shankar is angered on seeing his wife with another man in bed. He kills her, but not before she mortally wounds him. Arun, having escaped, is confronted by Leela who he realises is his mother. She allows him to perform his final concert, but has to have him hanged to death him after that. Right after he finishes his concert he is arrested, but Shanthi and Shankar finally arrive and tell the truth about Anand's death, after which Shankar succumbs. Arun's death sentence is revoked.

Cast 
 Mohan as Arun
 Lakshmi as Leela Chowdhry
 Revathi as Shanthi
 Goundamani as Balaji, the fake swami
 Anand Babu as Anand
 Prathapachandran as Shankar
 Kallapetti Singaram
 Senthil as Senthil, an inmate
 J. Lalitha as Shankar's wife
 Disco Shanti
T. K. S. Natarajan
Kovai Sarala as a police officer's daughter
 Shekhina Shawn as the sick child

Production 
The comedy subplot involving Goundamani and Senthil was written by A. Veerappan.

Soundtrack 
The soundtrack was composed by Ilaiyaraaja, this being his 300th film. The song "Thene Thenpaandi" is set in the Carnatic raga known as Sankarabharanam, "Paadu Nilavae" is set in the Kusumadharini raga, and the title song is set in Dhenuka.

Release and reception 
Udaya Geetham was released on 13 April 1985, a day before Puthandu. Despite facing competition from other Mohan films released in the same week such as Pillai Nila and Deivapiravi, the film became a commercial success, with a theatrical run of over 148 days, thereby becoming a silver jubilee film. Kalki criticised the film for numerous plot holes, but praised Ilaiyaraaja's music and Rangaraj's direction.

References

Bibliography

External links 

1980s Tamil-language films
1985 films
1985 thriller films
Films about miscarriage of justice
Films about music and musicians
Films about widowhood in India
Films directed by K. Rangaraj
Films scored by Ilaiyaraaja
Indian thriller films